Federation of Labour may refer to:

Federation of Labour (Ireland), a former political party in Northern Ireland
Labour Federation (Italy), a former political party in Italy
Labour Federation (Lithuania), a former political party in Lithuania
New Zealand Federation of Labour, now known as the New Zealand Council of Trade Unions

See also
Labour Party (disambiguation)